Sesame Tree is an adaptation of the American children's television series, Sesame Street, which was made entirely in Northern Ireland. The series was produced by Belfast based production company, Sixteen South and Sesame Workshop. The first episode aired on BBC Two in Northern Ireland on 5 April 2008, with the first series subsequently airing nationwide on CBeebies in August 2008.

A second series was launched in November 2010, and broadcast on CBeebies and BBC Two from 22 November 2010.

Production
The project had been under consideration since 2004; in Sesame Workshop's presentation on their international projects, Northern Ireland was listed as a goal, with the intent of 'building the Sesame model for respect and understanding curriculum across the sectarian divide."

In January 2006, The American Ireland Fund provided support to realise the project. Additional funding was secured from the International Fund for Ireland (IFI) and the Northern Ireland Fund for Reconciliation. Funding for the second series was provided by IFI and Northern Ireland Screen.

All the characters were developed by Sesame Workshop and Sixteen South, and the Muppets for the series were built by The Jim Henson Company in New York, who worked with exclusively local writers and Muppet Performers. Martin P. Robinson assisted in auditioning and training local performers, who include Lesa Gillespie, Paul Currie, Michael McNulty, Mike Smith, Helen Sloan and Alana Kerr.

The Northern Irish science fiction writer, Ian McDonald, has contributed scripts to the series, along with local writing trio Kieran Doherty, Danny Nash and Ian Nugent. Each of these four writers has written five episodes each, comprising the full twenty episodes of the first series.

Format
The initial series of Sesame Tree comprised twenty seventeen minute programmes, aimed at an audience of children aged 3 and up. Following a format similar to that of The Hoobs, it is composed of original puppet segments featuring Muppets created specifically for the series, local mini documentaries depicting a child's eye view of life in Northern Ireland, and classic Muppet segments from the library of Sesame Street.

The common area of the programme is the "Sesame Tree" – a hollow tree where children can ask questions and have them answered; the Sesame Tree is the programme's analogue to the street in the original Sesame Street programme. The residents of the Tree are Potto; Hilda and Archie, a new arrival for the second series.

The production also coincides with Tar ag Spraoi Sesame, an Irish dubbed package of Play with Me Sesame, airing on TG4 in Ireland. The title and background music for the programme was composed by artist of Northern Ireland, Duke Special.

Characters
 Potto (performed by Paul Currie and Michael McNulty) – The main character of the series. He is a book loving monster inventor who likes to "potter" around the devices. Potto is best friends with Hilda the Hare and is the cousin of Telly Monster. His puppet is the same AM Monster design that was used for Humphrey from Sesame Street.
 Hilda (performed by Lesa Gillespie) – A seven-year-old Irish Hare who is best friends with Potto.
 Claribelle (performed by Helen Sloan (series 1) and Alana Kerr (series 2)) – A bespectacled, red Muppet bird.
 Samson and Goliath (performed by Sarah Lyle and Alan Kerr) – A bunch of Bookworms that live amongst Potto's books.
 Weatherberries (performed by Sarah Lyle and Michael McNulty) – A bunch of singing fruit. They announce the weather whenever Hilda asks what the weather will be like that day.
 Archie (performed by Mike Smith) – A bespectacled red squirrel who loves math. He was introduced in Season 2.

Episodes

Series 1
 The Bookworms Move House
 Food for Thought
 Booga Granny Hare!
 The Share Necessities
 Big Hare Day
 Finders Keepers
 A Present for Claribelle
 CSI Sesame Tree
 Beezer Broccoli Birthday Cake
 Arty Party
 Turn and Turn About
 Practice Makes Perfect
 Potto's Really Rockin' Pocket Shoes
 One Wee Minute
 Hilda's Two Birthdays
 Same Difference
 Potto's Perfect Picnic
 Sad Hare Blues
 The Goldfish Tree
 A Very Special Visitor

Series 2
 Hilda's Beezer Buddies
 Best of Furry Friends
 Let's Have a Party
 Run Potto Run
 Out of Tune
 Super Squirrel's Super Glasses
 Potto's Heard of Cows
 Potto's Movie Mania (Elmgrove Primary School)
 Squirrel's Day
 It's Not Me It's You
 Potto's Never Ending Story
 Pizza Perfection
 Scaredy Squirrel
 Treemendous
 The Trying Game
 Promises, Promises
 Squirrel School
 The Big Sleepover
 Yes We Can
 Potto's Big Day Out

References

External links
 
 BBC Northern Ireland: Sesame Tree schools
 Sesame Tree at Muppet Wiki

Sesame Street international co-productions
BBC Northern Ireland television shows
2008 British television series debuts
2011 British television series endings
2000s British children's television series
2010s British children's television series
2000s television series from Northern Ireland
2010s television series from Northern Ireland
2000s preschool education television series
2010s preschool education television series
British television shows featuring puppetry
Television series by Sesame Workshop
CBeebies